= Courland Bay =

Courland Bay may refer to:

- Great Courland Bay also known as Turtle Beach, near Fort Bennett (Tobago) 11°12′52″N 60°47′02″W
- Little Courland Bay also known as Mount Irvine Bay, Tobago 11°11′24″N 60°48′00″W
- Courland Bay, in Tasmania, near Cape Lodi and Isaacs Point 41°56′24″S 148°18′20″E
